Sireli Ledua (born 12 December 1985 Suva, Fiji) is a Fijian rugby union footballer. He plays  at hooker and prop for the Flying Fijians.

Career

External links
 Profile of Sireli Ledua

Fijian rugby union players
1985 births
Living people
Sportspeople from Suva
I-Taukei Fijian people
Fiji international rugby union players
Rugby union props